Chris Weaver (born 1956) is a New Zealand potter. He has exhibited widely in New Zealand and internationally, winning many awards. His work is held in public museum collections in New Zealand, Australia and Japan.

Early life
Weaver was born in Te Awamutu, New Zealand in 1956. In 1975, he graduated from Otago Polytechnic with a Diploma in Fine and Applied Arts, completing a Ceramics Certificate the following year.

Career
Weaver largely produces clay tableware with minimal surface decoration. As Peter Gibbs wrote, "because he likes the enjoyment he gets from using hand-made objects, he especially likes making functional work."

Weaver’s key influences include the work of his teacher Michael Trumic, potter Hans Coper, sculptors Jean Arp and Henry Moore, Scandinavian design and Japanese craft traditions.

His series of ‘flatiron’ teapots, based upon a common colonial household item, the flatiron, have become an iconic part of New Zealand ceramic and design history. Douglas Lloyd Jenkins called this series "a seminal work of twentieth-century New Zealand design…" He wrote, "at a time when New Zealanders, both Pakeha and Maori, were re-examining their joint colonial past and not always liking what they saw, Weaver's teapot seemed to reach back into the past and pull out something unexpected, something stoic, and something symbolic of survival and eventual revival."

In 1995, Weaver was awarded a grant through Creative New Zealand to travel and study in the United States, the United Kingdom and Ireland. In 2007, he was one of six New Zealand potters invited to undertake a residency at FuLe International Ceramic Art Museum, in Fuping, China. In 2010, he was invited as an Artist in Residence at the Sturt Arts Centre in Mittagong, Australia.

Recognition
 1993 Norsewear Art Award for Ceramics
 1994 Norsewear Art Award - Merit Award
 1995 New Zealand Society of Potters - Merit Award
 1996 Fletcher Challenge Ceramics Award - Finalist
2011 Portage Ceramic Awards - second prize
2018 Otago Polytechnic Distinguished Alumni Award

Collections
Chris Weaver’s work is held in the collections of the Auckland War Memorial Museum; The Dowse Art Museum; the Suter Art Gallery, Nelson; Canterbury Museum; Hawkes Bay Museum, Napier; Shepparton Art Museum, Australia; and Mino Ceramic Park in Tajimi, Japan.

References

1956 births
People from Te Awamutu
New Zealand potters
New Zealand ceramicists
Living people